Did Jesus Exist? is a 1975 book written by the modern German language teacher and amateur historian George Albert Wells who speculated  on the evidence of Jesus Christ. Wells argues there was no historical evidence of Jesus existing. A revised second edition was published in 1986.

Wells has since modified his position, and in 2003 stated that he now disagrees with Robert M. Price on the information about Jesus being "all mythical". Wells now believes that the Jesus of the gospels is obtained by attributing the supernatural traits of the Pauline epistles to the human preacher of Q source.

Contents
Contents
Preface
Abbreviations for Books of the New Testament
Introduction
Jewish and Pagan Testimony to Jesus
Early Christian Epistles
The Origin and Nature of the Gospels
Christologies
The Twelve
Galilee and John the Baptist
Was Jesus a Political Rebel?
The Pagan and Jewish Background
The Debate Continues
Conclusion
Numbered List of References
Index of New Testament References
General Index

Reception
Bart Ehrman, in his Did Jesus Exist? (2012) stated: "The best-known mythicist of modern times — at least among the NT scholars who know of any mythicists at all — is George A. Wells...He has written many books and articles advocating a mythicist position, none more incisive than his 1975 book, Did Jesus Exist?. Wells is certainly one who does the hard legwork to make his case: Although an outsider to NT studies, he speaks the lingo of the field and has read deeply in its scholarship. Although most NT scholars will not (or do not) consider his work either convincing or particularly well argued." (p. 19).  Wells, 86, provided an answer to these points in an article in Free Inquiry.

See also
 Christ myth theory
 Historicity of Jesus
 Historical Jesus

References

External links
Description from Prometheus Books

1975 non-fiction books
Books critical of religion
Works about the Christ myth theory
Religious studies books
Prometheus Books books
1975 in Christianity